Ralph Pachalo Jooma is a Malawian politician. He was previously the  Deputy Minister of Health in Malawi. He was elected as a Member of Parliament for the Monkey Bay constituency in the Mangochi District under a Democratic Progressive Party (DPP) seat.

He was also chairman of the parliamentary committee on budget and finance in Malawi's parliament.

References

Living people
Government ministers of Malawi
People's Party (Malawi) politicians
Members of the National Assembly (Malawi)
Year of birth missing (living people)